During the 1996–97 English football season, Ipswich Town competed in the Football League First Division.

Season summary
In George Burley's second season in charge of Ipswich, the club reached the play-offs as they looked for a return to the Premier League at the second attempt. Ipswich were in the bottom half of the table for most of the first half of the season but their form in the new year saw Town go 10 games unbeaten and move into the play-off places. Jason Cundy was signed on loan in October to bolster the team and became permanent a month later but was diagnosed with testicular cancer in February and stopped playing. In January, Adam Tanner failed a drug test and was withdrawn from the squad and later suspended for three months.

In the play-offs, Ipswich faced Sheffield United in the semi-final. The first leg played at Bramall Lane finished 1–1. In the return leg, Niklas Gudmundsson gave Ipswich a 2–1 lead in the 73rd minute but their advantage lasted just four minutes until Andy Walker made it 2–2. With the aggregate scores level at 3–3, the game went into extra time but no further goals were scored, and Sheffield United advanced to the final as they had scored more away goals than Ipswich.

Ipswich also reached the quarter-finals of the Coca-Cola Cup, losing to Leicester City.

First-team squad

Left club during season

Competitions

Football League First Division

League table

Legend

Ipswich Town's score comes first

Matches

First Division play-offs

FA Cup

League Cup

Transfers

Transfers in

Loans in

Transfers out

Loans out

Awards

Player awards

References

Ipswich Town F.C. seasons
Ipswich Town